Jalan Sedili Kechil, Federal Route (formerly Johor state route J173), is a federal road in Johor, Malaysia. It is also a main route to Teluk Mahkota and Tanjung Balau. The Kilometre Zero of the Federal Route 213 starts at Tanjung Sedili.

Features
At most sections, the Federal Route 213 was built under the JKR R5 road standard, with a speed limit of 90 km/h.

List of junctions

References

Malaysian Federal Roads